Alice Elizabeth Drummond (née Ruyter, May 21, 1928 – November 30, 2016) was an American actress. A veteran Off-Broadway performer, she was nominated in 1970 for the Tony Award for Best Featured Actress in a Play for her performance as Mrs. Lee in The Chinese by Murray Schisgal. She may be best known as Alice, the librarian, in the opening scenes of the 1984 horror-comedy Ghostbusters.

Early life
Alice Elizabeth Ruyter was born in Pawtucket, Rhode Island in 1928, the daughter of Sarah Irene (née Alker), a secretary, and Arthur Ruyter, an auto mechanic. She graduated from Pembroke College (the women's college of Brown University) in 1950.

Career
Drummond played Nurse Jackson on the TV series Dark Shadows in 1967 and was a regular on the CBS soap opera, Where the Heart Is, on which she originated the role of Loretta Jardin, which she played until the series ended in 1973.  She also appeared in a short-term role on another CBS soap opera, As the World Turns. She appeared in guest roles on television series including Kate & Allie, Law & Order, Boston Legal and Yes, Dear.

One of Drummond's notable movie roles is a librarian haunted and frightened by a poltergeist at the beginning of the feature film Ghostbusters. She portrayed a temporarily animated catatonic patient in 1990's Awakenings. She also played a senior citizen in the movie Furry Vengeance. Other notable appearances include Ace Ventura: Pet Detective, To Wong Foo Thanks for Everything, Julie Newmar and Pieces of April.

Personal life and death
Alice Ruyter married Paul Drummond in 1951. They resided in Manhattan, New York City, New York. They separated in 1975 and divorced in 1976. 

She died on November 30, 2016, from complications of a fall at her home in The Bronx, New York City, at age 88.

Filmography

Film

Television

References

External links
 
 

1928 births
2016 deaths
Actresses from Rhode Island
Pembroke College in Brown University alumni
American film actresses
American soap opera actresses
American stage actresses
American television actresses
People from Pawtucket, Rhode Island
20th-century American actresses
21st-century American actresses
Accidental deaths from falls
Accidental deaths in New York (state)